Wardell Jackson (born July 18, 1951) is an American former professional basketball small forward who played one season in the National Basketball Association (NBA) as a member of the Seattle SuperSonics during the 1974–75 season. Born in Yazoo City, Mississippi, Jackson attended Ohio State University where he was drafted by the Sonics during the sixth round of the 1974 NBA draft.

External links

1951 births
Living people
American men's basketball players
Basketball players from Mississippi
Ohio State Buckeyes men's basketball players
People from Yazoo City, Mississippi
Seattle SuperSonics draft picks
Seattle SuperSonics players
Small forwards